Attin is a commune in the Pas-de-Calais department in northern France.

Geography
A small village situated 2 miles (3 km) north of Montreuil-sur-Mer, on the N39 road.

Population

See also
Communes of the Pas-de-Calais department

References

Communes of Pas-de-Calais